Belenois zochalia, the forest white or forest caper white, is a butterfly of the family Pieridae. It is found in Africa.

The wingspan is 40–50 mm. Adults are on wing year-round in warm areas.

The larvae feed on Capparis species, Maerua cafra and Maerua racemulosa.

Subspecies
B. z. zochalia (South Africa, Zimbabwe)
B. z. agrippinides (Holland, 1896) (Malawi, Tanzania, Kenya, Uganda)
B. z. connexiva (Joicey & Talbot, 1927) (highlands of Cameroon)
B. z. galla (Ungemach, 1932) (Ethiopia)
B. z. camerounica Bernardi, 1966 (Nigeria to Cameroon)

References

Seitz, A. Die Gross-Schmetterlinge der Erde 13: Die Afrikanischen Tagfalter. Plate XIII 12

Pierini
Butterflies of Africa
Butterflies described in 1836
Taxa named by Jean Baptiste Boisduval